The Green Party of Lebanon ( ĥizb-al-khodor-al-lubnanī) is a Lebanese green political party. Founded in August 2008, the green party advocates environmental protection, sustainable development, and human rights in Lebanon. It is the first Lebanese party to focus primarily on Green politics.

History
Environmental concerns in Lebanon have been overshadowed by the sectarian nepotist political system and consigned to the bottom of the political agenda. This is despite the fact that Lebanon's tourism industry - a key part of its economy - relies heavily on the green spaces and woodlands that distinguish Lebanon from neighboring countries.

The Green Party of Lebanon was founded on 20 August 2008 at a conference in Beirut's Monroe Hotel. The three-hour conference, which assembled 65 members of the Lebanese elite, presented the party's charter and political and economic work plan followed by the election of its 20-member executive board. The executive board elected Philip Skaf, chief executive and creative officer at Grey Worldwide MENA, an advertising agency,  as party president.

In March 2009, the Green Party declared a state of environmental emergency and announced the launching of an "environmental pact". Skaf declared that the Party would not run candidates in the 2009 Lebanese general election but stressed that the document will be presented to all Lebanese political parties in order for them to adopt its goals.

With electing Nada Zaarour as president in 2011 the Green Party is the first party in Lebanon with a female leader.
Lately, in June 2018, Mr Toufic Souk was elected as a new president for the GPL with a new political bureau succeeding Mrs. Zaarour.

Members 

Other Members
 Mohamad Al Khawli
 Fadi Chaar
 Fouad Chaya
 Navia Fahd
 Rony Kfoury
 Raymond Harb
 Nidal Chebli
 Rana Zaarour
 Hanna Mrad
 Georges Labaki
 Fouad Zwein

External links

References 

 
 

 

 - subscriber access

2008 establishments in Lebanon
Political parties established in 2008
Secularism in Lebanon
Political parties in Lebanon
Green political parties